The Miss Universe Argentina 2011 beauty pageant was held on 4 July 2011 at the Palacio Alsina, Carlos Pellegrini 101 located in Buenos Aires. The jury of the leading global beauty event consisted of a group of prominent figures in entertainment and fashion. The winner of Miss Universe Argentina 2011 was Miss Capital Federal (Natalia Rodriguez ). Miss Universe 2011 on 12 September in the city of Sao Paulo, Brazil. In addition, the winner  received an exclusive design by a famous designer, a motorcycle and a trip to Miami to have the unique opportunity to be interviewed by NBC. Miss Universe is owned by Donald Trump and NBC. In Argentina, the organizer of this event will again Mirta Schuster and communication of the event will be in charge of Citroen Nova, directed by Fernandez and Natalia Ayelén Notar. Teodelina de Carabassa y Gustavo López will be conducting the event.

Results

Delegates
There are 21 official contestants

Judges
The following persons judged the final competition
Mirtha Legrand (President of Judge)
Yesica Di Vincenzo (Miss Argentina 2010)
Evelyn  (Miss Argentina)
Adriana Salgueiro (Miss Argentina 1978)
Ingrid Grudke (Queen of Queens in Missions)
 Daniel Félix (Plastic Surgeon)
Karina Ravena (Dermatologist of the Misses)
Juan Poccard (TRESemmé).

See also
 Miss Universo Argentina 2016

References

2011
2011 in Argentina
2011 beauty pageants